António Galantinho (born 14 May 1946) is a Portuguese wrestler. He competed in the men's Greco-Roman 70 kg at the 1968 Summer Olympics.

References

External links
 

1946 births
Living people
Portuguese male sport wrestlers
Olympic wrestlers of Portugal
Wrestlers at the 1968 Summer Olympics
People from Torres Vedras
Sportspeople from Lisbon District